Adel Osseiran (5 June 1905 – 18 June 1998), also transliterated Adil 'Usayran or Adil Osseyran, was a prominent Lebanese statesman, a former Speaker of the Lebanese Parliament, and one of the founding fathers of the Lebanese Republic.

Adel Osseiran played a significant role at various points in the history of modern Lebanon, such as the struggle for independence (1943), the mini-civil war of 1958, and the Lausanne Conference for Peace (1984).

Background and family life

The Osseiran family traces its Shia origins to what is now Iraq and there to the tribe of the Bani Asad, which fought alongside Husayn ibn Ali at Karbala in 680. After their defeat the survivors suffered persecution and after an unknown period of time one of the tribal members - Haidar - reportedly fled to Baalbek, where he had two sons: Ali and Osseiran. According to the family's historiography, the latter settled in Sidon/Saida. Historians have established that the Osseirans rose to prominence and power as grain merchants in Sidon and the Jabal Amel region of modern-day Southern Lebanon soon after the Ottoman Empire assumed control over the area in 1516:"Having arrived some time in the sixteenth or seventeenth century and built up significant wealth from mercantile activities, they were eventually appointed consuls for Iran. As consuls they, and their employees, were exempt from Ottoman military service and were levied a lower tax on their goods. This allowed them to build their wealth more rapidly and to gather a greater supporter base in Saida and Zahrani (where they owned land) due to the privileges accorded their employees."

Born on 5 June 1905 to Abdallah Ali Effendi Osseiran and Zahra Al Hajj Hassan Osseiran, Adel was his parents' only son, followed by three sisters. His father died of the Typhus epidemic in 1917 when Adel was 12 years old, and he was raised by his mother and paternal uncles.
Adel Osseiran received his early education at the French Missionary Elementary School (Les Frères) operated by De La Salle Brothers in Sidon, and completed his secondary education at the International College (IC) in Beirut. He then pursued his higher studies at the American University of Beirut, graduating with a degree in History and Politics in 1928. He returned to his alma mater to do an MA in Political Science, graduating in 1936. During the interval, he had also begun a law degree at the Saint Joseph University (USJ) but did not complete it. A powerful orator in Classical Arabic, he was also fluent in English and French.

In 1936 he married Souad Al Hajj Ismail Al-Khalil, by whom he had seven children: the late Abdallah, the MP Ali Osseiran, and five daughters: Zhour, Afaf, Samia, Zeina, and Leila. His daughter Leila married Iraqi politician Ahmed Chalabi in 1971; they had four children.

Souad Al Khalil Osseiran was an educated woman by the standards of her time, and was also a part-time painter. The marriage was a love match.

Health problems
An active and athletic man for much of his life, in later life Adel Osseiran developed serious health problems, not the least of which was his tremor. According to popular belief he had Parkinson's Disease, but in fact, he suffered from a more obscure malady known as Essential Tremor. This hereditary disease made it difficult for him to pursue the activities of his daily life, although his mind remained sharp.

Political career

Adel Osseiran began his political career in 1936 right after his graduation when, alongside various dignitaries from Southern Lebanon (Jabal Amil), he began to campaign for the abolition of the tax that the French mandatory authorities were levying on agricultural land, particularly on tobacco farmers. After being arrested for making a fiery speech, he was taken to court and assigned a lawyer. However, he rejected all manner of legal counsel and undertook his own defense, turning it into a vigorous and spirited attack on the wrongdoings of the French mandatory authorities, as he saw them.

In the same year, he founded the Arab Youth Party which called for the unity of Lebanon's youth under the banner of modern education, civic service, and the strengthening of national unity. The party, however, eventually became non-operational due to lack of funding and other reasons.

In 1937 Adel Osseiran ran for the Lebanese parliament for the first time, and was the first candidate in the history of Lebanon to have a proper campaign platform. He was, however, opposed by the French and their allies, and lost the election.

In 1943 Osseiran was elected to the Lebanese parliament for the first time, a victory that proved to be the beginning of a long parliamentary career that ended only with his retirement from politics in 1992. He won every election after that with the exception of two (1951 and 1964).

Until 2004 he held the record for the longest serving Member of Parliament in Lebanon's history.

1943 was a landmark year in the history of modern Lebanon. The new President Bechara El Khoury, PM Riad Al Solh, along with the rest of the Cabinet of which Adel Osseiran was a member, proceeded to abolish the articles of the constitution that tied Lebanon to the French Mandate. Upon their doing so the French High Commissioner had the President, the Prime Minister, and the Cabinet members arrested and imprisoned in the Citadel of Rashaya. After the public outcry that occurred, with protests taking place all over the country, in addition to Anglo-American support, the French were compelled to release the cabinet members and recognize the independence of Lebanon.

Adel Osseiran was the first person to hoist the new Lebanese flag over the town hall of Sidon.

Milestones
In 1947 he was chosen to mediate a dispute between the Iranian and Saudi Arabian governments over the issue of Iranian pilgrims traveling to Mecca, thus restoring diplomatic relations between the two countries.
In the same year he was chosen by the Lebanese government to be part of the delegation that traveled to New York  to vote against the UN Partition of Palestine.
In 1952 he took part in the Deir el Qamar conference, a gathering of Lebanese politicians that came together in opposition to the regime of President Bechara El Khoury, and which eventually led to the latter's downfall. In September 1952, Camille Chamoun was elected President of Lebanon, and the following year Adel Osseiran was elected speaker of Parliament, with Ghassan Tueni as Deputy Speaker.
In 1983 he participated in the Geneva Conference for Peace and Reconciliation in Lebanon.
In 1984 he participated at the Lausanne Conference for Peace, where he called for secularism, the complete abolition of the confessional (sectarian) system in politics once and for all, and a general revamping of Lebanon's political system. He also shocked the political establishment by calling for "armed resistance" to the Israeli occupation of Southern Lebanon.
In 1989 he participated in the Tunisia conference convened by the Six Nation Arab State Commission for Peace in Lebanon.
His last major political contribution came in 1989, when he participated in the Ta'ef Conference for National Dialogue in Saudi Arabia. The accord that resulted from this conference helped to end the Lebanese Civil War.

Speaker of the Lebanese Parliament

Adel Osseiran was voted Speaker of the Parliament of Lebanon on August 13, 1953, and held that post until October 15, 1959. During the mini-Civil War of 1958 he played a significant role in ending the riots and disturbances and securing the election of General Fouad Chehab as President of the Republic. He did so by calling Parliament into session to elect the new president, despite pressure not to do so from then President Camille Chamoun.

Earlier on, he had angered President Chamoun by vocally opposing the landing of the US Marines in Lebanon, and lodging a formal protest on the subject with the UN Secretary General in New York as well as with US President Dwight Eisenhower in Washington, DC.

Despite his early support for Fouad Chehab, Adel Osseiran later grew distant from the president and eventually joined the ranks of the opposition, mainly due to Chehab's suppression of civil liberties and his fostering of a de facto police state.

Minister in the Lebanese Government
Adel Osseiran held several cabinet portfolios in the course of his political career.

He was Minister of Provisions, Commerce and the Economy between 1943 and 1945. 
He was Minister of the Interior in the Government of Prime Minister Rashid Karami from November 1968 to September 1969.

He was Minister of Justice in the period 1969-1970 and returned as minister of Justice in the government of Rashid el Solh in October 1974 in which capacity he remained until May 15, 1975, by which time the Civil War had broken out.

He held the Ministries of Justice, Commerce and Public Works in Rashid Karami's six-man cabinet from 30 June 1975 until 9 December 1976 and after the amendment of 16 July 1976 he returned as Minister of Justice, Education, Tourism and Urban Planning.

He was also Minister of both Defense and Agriculture in the Cabinet of PM Rashid Karami, which lasted from 1984 until 1989 (from 1987 under PM Selim Al Huss following Karami's assassination).

Throughout his long ministerial career, Adel Osseiran was reputed to have refrained from engaging in corruption, nepotism, or any related activities, something that is considered to be a rare attribute among Lebanese politicians.

Legacy
Throughout his long political career, Adel Osseiran was celebrated for being an independent thinker with brave and visionary ideas as well as sharp political acumen. He was also, throughout much of his life, a radical modernizer. Standing for election as an MP in 1937, he was the first candidate in Lebanon's history to have a campaign platform based on issues rather than traditional or emotional slogans.

He was, throughout his life, a firm believer in the value of education, seeing it as the way up the ladder for his underprivileged constituency in Southern Lebanon. Beyond that, he was known to have a high regard for scholarship, something illustrated by the close ties he kept with the American University of Beirut (AUB), serving as President of the AUB Alumni Club between 1959 and 1961.

During the 1950s he created an orphanage in Sidon and handed it over to private management. Beyond that, in the 1960s, he founded an agricultural academy in the village of Shoukin in Southern Lebanon to train local farmers in modern methods. It was built partly at his own expense and partly by donations from Lebanese emigres in West Africa. It was destroyed during the Israeli invasion of 1982 but has since been rebuilt, though it has yet to reopen its doors to students. In the 1950s, as Speaker of Parliament, he was one of the prime movers behind the legislation that brought about the Litani Plan, a development project which, though not completed until the present time, would have transformed Lebanon's rural economy.

Before 1943 he was outspoken in his opposition to the French Mandate, while during the 1958 crisis he curtly demanded the removal of the US Marines from Lebanese soil. Later, in his old age, he called for "armed resistance" to the Israeli occupation of Southern Lebanon.

Throughout the Lebanese Civil War he maintained the same stance, that the sectarian violence must come to an end and that there must be some kind of coexistence between all sects and groups in Lebanese society. Remaining in office and holding various Cabinet posts during the dark days of the war, he aligned himself with the Lebanese state and with the remaining symbols of legitimacy.

Adel Osseiran retired from politics in 1992 and retreated to his home near Sidon. He died on June 18, 1998. He was honored as a national hero and given a state funeral.

The Adel Osseiran Street in Sidon bears his name.

See also
Osseiran family
MP Ali Osseiran
Sheikh Mohamad Osseiran
Ayad Allawi
Ahmed Chalabi

References

1905 births
1998 deaths
Osseiran family
Legislative speakers of Lebanon
Lebanese Shia Muslims
Lebanese people from the Ottoman Empire
Agriculture ministers of Lebanon
Defense ministers of Lebanon
Government ministers of Lebanon
American University of Beirut alumni